Krulj is a Serbian surname.

On June 26/27, 1941, Ustaše drove away 130 Serbs of the families of Šakota, Šotra, Ćorluka and Krulj from the villages of Trijebanj and Kozice. At least 45 individuals with the surname died at the Jasenovac concentration camp.

It may refer to:

Igor Krulj, Swedish footballer
Uroš Krulj, Ban of Zeta (1931–1932)
Bojan Krulj, Serbian footballer
Nikola Krulj, Serbian Orthodox Metropolitan of Dabar-Bosna

References

Serbian surnames